San Antonio was a 64-gun ship of the line of the Spanish Navy.

On 13 August 1762 she was captured by the Royal Navy, and commissioned as the Third Rate HMS San Antonio.

Fate
San Antonio was sold out of the navy in 1775.

References

Bibliography
Lavery, Brian (2003) The Ship of the Line - Volume 1: The development of the battlefleet 1650-1850. Conway Maritime Press. .

Ships of the line of the Spanish Navy
Ships of the line of the Royal Navy